Geitonoplesium is a monotypic genus in the family Asphodelaceae,  containing the sole species Geitonoplesium cymosum, commonly known as scrambling lily. The species  is a perennial evergreen scrambling vine found in rainforests, sclerophyll forests and woodlands of eastern Australia, and parts of Malesia and Melanesia.

Both surfaces of the leaves are glossy, with the midvein prominent and raised on upper surface. 
The flowers are mauve to white. There is a high degree of variation in the shape of the leaves, which has resulted in the establishment of numerous infraspecific taxa over the years, however none of these are recognised by leading present-day authorities.

Uses
The shoots are edible when boiled, and comparable to asparagus.

References

Hemerocallidoideae
Monotypic Asphodelaceae genera
Bushfood
Leaf vegetables
Monocots of Australia
Flora of Fiji
Flora of Malesia
Flora of New Guinea
Flora of New Caledonia